Stanley Tennenbaum (April 11, 1927 – May 4, 2005) was an American mathematician who contributed to the field of logic.  In 1959, he published Tennenbaum's theorem, which states that no countable nonstandard model of Peano arithmetic (PA) can be recursive, i.e. the operations + and × of a nonstandard model of PA are not recursively definable in the + and × operations of the standard model. He was a professor at Yeshiva University in the 1960s.

References

External links 

Historical Remarks on Suslin's Problem Article by Akihiro Kanamori describing some of Tennenbaum's work, with some biographical info.

1927 births
2005 deaths
20th-century American mathematicians
21st-century American mathematicians